Henri Lignon (1884 – 1 November 1935) was a French cyclist. He was second place twice in the French National Road Race Championships in 1907 and 1909, and sixteenth of the Tour de France in 1905.

Palmarès
1905
16th of the Tour de France
1907
2nd of the French National Road Race Championships
1909
Reims-Nancy
2nd of the French National Road Race Championships
3rd of Paris-La Flèche
1910
Coppa Val d'Olona
3rd of the Giro della Romagna
1911
5th of 1911 Milan–San Remo

References

External links 
 Henri Lignon on Site du cyclisme

1884 births
Year of death missing
People from Lunéville
French male cyclists
Sportspeople from Meurthe-et-Moselle
Cyclists from Grand Est